Hygrophorus mesotephrus is a species of fungus in the genus Hygrophorus.

References

mesotephrus
Fungi of Europe
Fungi described in 1854
Taxa named by Miles Joseph Berkeley
Taxa named by Christopher Edmund Broome